English v Sanderson Blinds Ltd [2008] EWCA Civ 1421 is a UK labour law case on the question of whether a person can claim discrimination for sexuality without being (or without revealing that one is) actually gay. The Court of Appeal decided that it was irrelevant whether someone was gay or not or the bullies believe the person is gay or not, if the harassment has sexuality as its focus.

Facts
Stephen English, who lived in Brighton, was a heterosexual married man with three children who worked for Thomas Sanderson Ltd between 1996 and August 2005, when he left voluntarily. He went to an Employment Tribunal, claiming harassment in the workplace under section 5 of the Employment Equality (Sexual Orientation) Regulations 2003, alleging that he had been the subject of homophobic mockery, but the tribunal rejected his claim because he admitted that none of his work colleagues had actually thought he was gay. He was represented by Frederic Reynold QC.

Judgment

Employment Appeal Tribunal
At the Employment Appeal Tribunal, Peter-Clark J held he was not persuaded any material difference existed between the "on grounds" provisions in the Sex Discrimination Act and the Employment Equality (Sexual Orientation) Regulations 2003. He held the Regulations do not properly implement the Directive (at 21), as was held by Burton J in EOC v. SS for Trade and Industry [2007] IRLR 327. So people should be allowed to claim even when they are not themselves gay.

However, he then said that the claimant’s difficulty was that nobody thought he was gay (at 23), so that the harassment was not on grounds of sexual orientation at all. It was a ‘vehicle for teasing the Claimant’ (at 24). He then said ‘without deciding the point, that the result may have been different on direct application of the Directive’.

Court of Appeal
The Court of Appeal by a majority applied the Directive directly, overturning the EAT's decision. Laws LJ gave the first judgment, and dissented, saying there was no harassment under regulation 5. Sedley LJ found that there was harassment,

Lawrence Collins LJ agreed with Sedley LJ, and said there was harassment.

See also
Employment discrimination law in the UK

Notes

External links
Sanderson Blinds' website
Afua Hirsch, 'Landmark rulings strengthen gay rights in workplace' (20.12.2008) The Guardian

United Kingdom labour case law
United Kingdom LGBT rights case law
Court of Appeal (England and Wales) cases
2008 in case law
2008 in LGBT history
2008 in British law
Anti-discrimination law in the United Kingdom
Harassment case law